Euophrys maseruensis is a jumping spider species in the genus Euophrys that lives in Lesotho. It was first described in 2014.

References

Salticidae
Fauna of Lesotho
Spiders of Africa
Spiders described in 2014
Taxa named by Wanda Wesołowska